This is a list of episodes of The Bill, which ran from 16 August 1983 to 31 August 2010. 26 series were made.

Series overview

Episodes

Pilot (1983)

Series 1 (1984-85)

Series 2 (1985-86)

Series 3 (1987)

Series 4 (1988)

Series 5 (1989)

Series 6 (1990)

Series 7 (1991)

Series 8 (1992)

Series 9 (1993)

Series 10 (1994)

Series 11 (1995)

Series 12 (1996)

Series 13 (1997)

Series 14 (1998)

Series 15 (1999)

Series 16 (2000)

Series 17 (2001)

Series 18 (2002)

Series 19 (2003)

Series 20 (2004)

Series 21 (2005)

Series 22 (2006)

Series 23 (2007)

Series 24 (2008)

Series 25 (2009)

Series 26 (2010)

Cancellation

On 26 March 2010, ITV had announced that The Bill would end after 27 years on air, due to a drop of ratings and on 31 August 2010, The Bill aired its final episode, Respect: Part 2 in Series 26 bringing the total number of episodes to 2425.

External links
 TV.com Show guide

Episodes
Lists of British crime television series episodes